Martin John Bamber (born 7 January 1961) is a former English cricketer.  Bamber was a right-handed batsman who bowled right-arm medium pace.  He was born in Cheam, Surrey.

Having previously played Second XI cricket for Middlesex and Surrey between 1976 and 1981, Bamber eventually joined Northamptonshire, making his first-class debut for the county against Cambridge University in 1982.  He made a further twelve first-class appearances for the county, the last of which came against Somerset in the 1984 County Championship.  In his thirteen first-class matches, he scored a total of 638 runs at an average of 26.58, with a high score of 77.  This score, which was one of three first-class fifties he made, came against Cambridge University in 1982.  He made his List A debut in the 1983 John Player Special League against Surrey.  He made nine further List A appearances, the last of which came in the 1984 John Player Special League against Somerset.  In his ten List A matches, he scored 205 runs at an average of 29.28, with a high score of 71.  This score, which was his only List A fifty, came against Surrey in 1983.  He left Northamptonshire at the end of the 1984 season.

References

External links
Martin Bamber at ESPNcricinfo
Martin Bamber at CricketArchive

1961 births
Living people
People from Cheam
English cricketers
Northamptonshire cricketers